Eupithecia omissa is a moth in the family Geometridae. It is found in north-western China (Shaanxi, Gansu).

The wingspan is about 18–20 mm. The forewings are mid brown and the hindwings are white, dotted with brown scales.

References

Moths described in 2004
omissa
Moths of Asia